Mahinur Ergun (born 1 January 1956) is a Turkish screenwriter and film director. Her first well-known television series were Şaşıfelek Çıkmazı as a director and Asmalı Konak as a screenwriter.

Biography 
Ergun was born on 1 January 1956 in Bursa, Bursa Province, Turkey. She graduated at the radio, television and cinema Communication Faculty of University of Ankara in 1978. Then she produced ad movies for a year.

Her first cinema movie is from 1988,  Gece Dansı Tutsakları, about the love between a journalist and a dancer.

She helped in the starting of  Çağan Irmak film director's career.

She was a member of the jury at the 44th Golden Orange Film Festival in 2007.

Filmography

References 

Turkish women film directors
Turkish female screenwriters
1956 births
Living people